
Year 384 (CCCLXXXIV) was a leap year starting on Monday (link will display the full calendar) of the Julian calendar. At the time, it was known as the Year of the Consulship of Ricomer and Clearchus (or, less frequently, year 1137 Ab urbe condita). The denomination 384 for this year has been used since the early medieval period, when the Anno Domini calendar era became the prevalent method in Europe for giving names to years.

Events 
 By place 

 Roman Empire 
 Magnus Maximus elevates his son Flavius Victor to the rank of Augustus.
 Magnus Maximus returns to Britain, to aid the Roman army with the barbarian raids triggered by Maximus' withdrawal of troops to the continent. 
 The Forum of Theodosius ("Forum of the Bull") is built in Constantinople.
 Quintus Aurelius Symmachus becomes urban prefect of Rome.
 An edict of Theodosius I closes pagan temples in the Nile Valley (Egypt). 
 Stilicho marries Serena, adopted niece of Theodosius I.

 Persia 
 King Shapur III signs a treaty with Theodosius I. Armenia is divided in two kingdoms, and becomes a vassal state of the Roman Empire and Persia. The friendly relations survive for 36 years.

 Asia 
 King Chimnyu ascends to the throne of Baekje (Korea); he welcomes the Indian Buddhist monk Marananta into his palace, and later declares Buddhism the official religion.
 Gogugyang becomes ruler of the Korean kingdom of Goguryeo.

 China 
 The Battle of Fei River - Former Qin forces are defeated by the numerically inferior Eastern Jin army, preserving the Jin state in the south and precipitating the destruction of Former Qin in the north.

 By topic 

 Religion 
 December 17 – Pope Siricius succeeds Damasus I as the 38th pope. He takes the title Pontifex Maximus, after it is relinquished by the late emperor Gratian.
 Jerome, Christian prophet, writes his celebrated  letter "De custodia virginitatis" (vow of virginity) to Eustochium, daughter of the ascetic Paula. He has by this time completed his Vulgate translation of the Gospels.
 Ambrosius refuses the request of Empress Justina for a church in Milan, where she can worship according to her Arian belief.
 A synod is held in Bordeaux (France).
 The Gallaeci or Gallic woman Egeria concludes her Christian pilgrimage to the Holy Land at about this date; her narrative of it, the Itinerarium Egeriae, may be the earliest surviving formal writing by a woman in western European culture.

Births 
 September 9 – Honorius, Roman Emperor (d. 423)
 Chu Lingyuan, last empress of the Jin Dynasty (d. 436)
 Maria, empress and daughter of Stilicho (approximate date)
 Sengzhao, Chinese Buddhist philosopher (d. 414)
 Wang Shen'ai, empress of the Jin Dynasty (d. 412)

Deaths 

 May 13 – Servatius of Tongeren, Roman Catholic bishop and saint
 July 20 – Pope Timothy I of Alexandria
 December 11 – Pope Damasus I

Date unknown 
 Chu Suanzi, empress of the Jin Dynasty (b. 324)
 Geungusu, king of Baekje (Korea)
 Huan Chong, general and governor of the Jin Dynasty (b. 328)
 Murong Hong, founder of the Xianbei state Western Yan
 Vettius Agorius Praetextatus, praetorian prefect
 Xi Zuochi, Jin Dynasty historian

References